Ajay Dev Goud (born 15 February 2000) is an Indian cricketer. He made his first-class debut for Hyderabad in the 2018–19 Ranji Trophy on 30 December 2018. He made his List A debut on 28 September 2019, for Hyderabad in the 2019–20 Vijay Hazare Trophy. He made his Twenty20 debut on 15 November 2019, for Hyderabad in the 2019–20 Syed Mushtaq Ali Trophy.

References

External links
 

2000 births
Living people
Indian cricketers
Hyderabad cricketers
Place of birth missing (living people)